"Nathalie" is a 1964 song by French singer Gilbert Bécaud.

Its lyrics were written by Pierre Delanoë and its music composed by Gilbert Bécaud. The song was released in May 1964 and was a big success.

The song talks about a beautiful Soviet tourist guide. It is claimed that the song "Nathalie" reflected the beginning of reapprochement between France and the USSR.

Track listings 
7" single (Electrola E 23 050, 45-EG 9536, West Germany, 1965)
 Nathalie	
 L'orange	

7" single (Columbia 12 266 X, 1964)
 Nathalie (4:07)
 Et maintenant (2:38)

7" single (Electrola E 23 046, West Germany, 1965)
7" single (Electrola / Ex Libris E 923 046, West Germany, 1965)
 Nathalie (4:01) — German-language version
 Nimm dir doch Zeit (3:09)

7" single (Netherlands, France)
 Mon arbre
 Nathalie

Charts

References 

1964 songs
1964 singles
Songs about Moscow
Songs about occupations
Gilbert Bécaud songs
Electrola singles